Bros may refer to:

 Bros, abbreviation for brothers
 Bros (British band), English boy band
 Bros (Canadian band), Canadian musical duo and side project of the Sheepdogs
 Brös, Italian cheese preparation
 Bros (chocolate bar), Dutch chocolate bar produced by Nestlé
 Bros (film), 2022 American romantic comedy directed by Nicholas Stoller
 Bros Music, record label
 "Bros" (Wolf Alice song), a song released by Wolf Alice in 2015
 "Bro's" (song), a song released in 2006 by Panda Bear
 Baltimore Rock Opera Society, all-volunteer theatrical company located in Baltimore, Maryland, U.S.
 Dutch Bros. Coffee (NYSE: BROS), American coffee chain

See also
 
 Bro (disambiguation)
 Bro culture, a male youth subculture associated with partying, fraternities, and sport
 Broe, surname
 Super Mario Bros.
 Super Smash Bros.
 Warner Bros.